Jaime Abdul Gutiérrez Avendaño (5 April 1936 – 9 August 2012) was Salvadoran military officer and politician. He was one of the leaders of the 1979 Salvadoran coup d'état which overthrew President General Carlos Humberto Romero and established the Revolutionary Government Junta of El Salvador, ending 48 years of exclusive military rule in the country. The coup started the 12-year-long Salvadoran Civil War which lasted until 1992.

Gutiérrez served as a representative of the Armed Forces of El Salvador (FAES) in the Revolutionary Government Junta from 1979 until the dissolution of the junta in 1982. He also serves as the junta's chairman in 1980, as its vice president from 1980 to 1982, and served as commander-in-chief of the armed forces 1980 to 1982.

Early life 

Jaime Abdul Gutiérrez Avendaño was born on 5 April 1936 in Sonsonate, El Salvador. He graduated from the Captain General Gerardo Barrios Military School. He served in the Salvadoran Army as an engineer, and received a degree from the Higher Military Engineering School of Mexico in 1968. In July 1969, he returned to El Salvador and took part in Football War with neighboring Honduras.

Revolutionary Government of the Junta 

In 1979, Gutiérrez joined a military conspiracy to overthrow the regime of President General Carlos Humberto Romero. The conspiracy culminated in a coup d'état on 15 October 1979. After the overthrow of Romero, the Juventud Militar, which lead the conspiracy, established the Revolutionary Government Junta of El Salvador. Gutiérrez was one of the two military representatives on the junta, with the other being Colonel Adolfo Arnoldo Majano. Gutiérrez was considered the second most important person in the junta after Majano. The other members of the junta were Mario Antonio Andino, the vice president of the Chamber of Commerce and Industry of El Salvador, Román Mayorga Quirós, a member of the Central American University, and Guillermo Ungo, a democratic socialist politician.

Gutiérrez and Majano disagreed on how to solve El Salvador's deepening political crisis; Majano sought radical social reform, while Gutiérrez, who represented the conservative-minded army, preferred conservative military methods. On 12 May 1980, right-wingers within the military removed Majano as the chairman of the junta and Gutiérrez took over as chairman and commander-in-chief of the armed forces. He led the transition to open civil war. Over the following months, terror escalated and hostilities spread throughout the country.

After Majano was removed from the junta, the third Revolutionary Government Junta was formed on 13 December 1980. Christian Democrat José Napoleón Duarte was appointed president of El Salvador while Gutiérrez took over as vice president and Commander-in-Chief of the Armed Forces. Over the next year and a half, the new government managed not only to maintain a military advantage and retain power, but also to hold elections to the Constitutional Assembly on 28 March 1982. On 2 May 1982, both Duarte and Gutiérrez resigned, ending the Revolutionary Government Junta and transferring power to the interim president-elect Álvaro Magaña.

Retirement 

Gutiérrez resigned as commander-in-chief of the army on 18 May 1982. He took over as president of the National Communications Administration (ANTEL), was chairman of the Executive Commission of the Hydroelectric Complex on the Lempa River (CEL), and held a number of other important posts.

Death 

Military authorities reported that Gutiérrez died on 9 August 2012 at his home in La Libertad. He was buried on 10 August 2012 at the Montelena Funerary Complex in Antiguo Cuscatlán after a funeral Mass.

Legacy 

Gutiérrez is a controversial figure in Salvadoran society: some consider him a dictator and conductor of state terror, others consider him an honest military man who "did not sit down at the negotiating table with criminals" and provided stability to the country. His participation in the 1979 coup is also debated: one view is he helped end the bloody dictatorship of Romero, another accuses him of removing a regime that had ensured stability since 1962.

The National Institution of General and Engineer Jaime Abdul Gutiérrez in Sonsonate, founded on 6 July 1981, is named after him.

See also 

Adolfo Arnoldo Majano

References

Citations

Bibliography 

 

1936 births
2012 deaths
Leaders who took power by coup
People from Sonsonate Department
People of the Salvadoran Civil War
Salvadoran military personnel
Vice presidents of El Salvador
Captain General Gerardo Barrios Military School alumni